Gorno Orizari is a village in the municipality of Veles, North Macedonia.

Demographics
Emigration from the village by inhabitants and its subsequent depopulation has been alleviated with the population being replaced by people from Sandžak. Bosniaks settled in Gorno Orizari after the Turkish population migrated from the village. In the 1960s there were 30 Muslim Albanian households in the village.

According to the 2002 census, the village had a total of 2262 inhabitants. Ethnic groups in the village include:

Bosniaks 2032
Macedonians 113
Albanians 66
Serbs 22 
Turks 15
Romani 1
Others 13

References

External links

Villages in Veles Municipality